Rhamnocercus is a genus of monopisthocotylean monogeneans in the family Diplectanidae. All species of Rhamnocercus are parasites of marine perciform fishes of the family Sciaenidae.

Species
According to the World Register of Marine Species, the following species are included in the genus:

 Rhamnocercus bairdiella Hargis, 1955 
 Rhamnocercus margaritae Fuentes-Zambrano, 1997 
 Rhamnocercus oliveri Luque & Iannacone, 1991 
 Rhamnocercus rhamnocercus Monaco, Wood & Mizelle, 1954  (Type-species)
 Rhamnocercus stelliferi Luque & Iannacone, 1991

References

Diplectanidae
Monogenea genera
Parasites of fish